This walking and cycling track runs along Campbells Creek in the town of the same name, Victoria Australia.   

The track initially runs besides Barkers Creek until the junction with Forest Creek and thereafter the combined flow is known as Campbells Creek.  The trail starts at Forest Street Castlemaine, near the corner of Camp Reserve and finishes at the Campbells Creek Park, opposite the primary school.  

Other entrances alone the route include:  
 Gaulton Street, Castlemaine
 Camp Crescent, Castlemaine
 Midland Highway, Castlemaine
 Farnsworth Street, Castlemaine
 Butterworth Street, Castlemaine
 Ray Street, Castlemaine
 The south side of the Pyrenees Hwy (Elizabeth Street) underpass
 Lewis Drive, Castlemaine
 Princess Street, Campbells Creek
 Honeycomb Road, Campbells Creek

Except for a small gap, which presently causes a detour, the track follows the beds of the creek connecting Castlemaine with the length of Campbells Creek.  Most of the track can be done without crossing a road.  There are several bridges on the route where the track passes over the creek.  The Castlemaine - Maldon railway line passes over both the trail and Campbells Creek via a timber trestle bridge south of the Pyrenees Highway (Elizabeth Street). The Castlemaine to Maldon Trail (which runs alongside most of the Victorian Goldfields Railway line and was completed during 2017) connects with the Campbells Creek Trail adjacent to the Pyrenees Highway (Elizabeth Street).

The track crosses flood plains covered with native vegetation and it is remarkable, at some points, how remote an observer can feel from the surrounding  urban environment.  Along its length are interactive notice boards, and scenic seats to take in the billabongs and flood plains which are covered in Australian plants and bird-life.

The trail is cared for by the Mt Alexander Shire Council and volunteers from the Friends of Campbells Creek Landcare group.

References

Hiking and bushwalking tracks in Victoria (Australia)